Kuytunsky District is an administrative district, one of the thirty-three in Irkutsk Oblast, Russia. Municipally, it is incorporated as Kuytunsky Municipal District. Its administrative center is the urban locality (a work settlement) of Kuytun. Population:  38,311 (2002 Census);  The population of Kuytun accounts for 31.7% of the district's total population.

References

Notes

Sources

Districts of Irkutsk Oblast